Stigmella stettinensis is a moth of the family Nepticulidae. It is found in Lithuania, Poland, The Czech Republic and Slovakia.

It was considered a synonym of Stigmella minusculella, but was raised to species status by A & Z Lastuvka in 2004.

There are three generations per year in central Europe.

The larvae feed on Pyrus communis. They mine the leaves of their host plant. The mine consists of a gradually widening corridor. The shape and length of the mine are strongly dependent on the thickness of the leaf.

External links
Fauna Europaea
bladmineerders.nl

Nepticulidae
Moths of Europe
Moths described in 1871